Gary H. Dahms (born January 14, 1947) is a Minnesota politician and member of the Minnesota Senate. A member of the Republican Party of Minnesota, he represents District 16, which includes all or portions of Brown, Lac qui Parle, Lyon, Redwood, Renville, and Yellow Medicine counties in the southwestern part of the state.

Early life, education, and career
Dahms graduated from Redwood Falls High School in 1965, then went on to the University of Minnesota, earning a B.S. degree in agricultural business administration.

Dahms is the former owner of Riverside Motors and American Family Insurance Agency in Redwood Falls. He most recently served as a Redwood County Commissioner, and was also a board member of the Redwood County Soil and Water Conservation District, the Redwood County Agricultural Society, the Redwood Area Development Corporation, the Redwood County Economic Development Association, the Southwest Minnesota Regional Development Commission, the Minnesota Valley Rail Authority, and the Redwood–Renville Health Services Board.

Minnesota Senate
Dahms was first elected in 2010, succeeding retiring longtime Senator Dennis Frederickson of New Ulm. He was reelected in 2012 and 2016.

In April 2015 Dahms voted against the Sunday liquor sales bill, which would have repealed the long-standing ban on Sunday liquor sales in Minnesota. His opposition to breweries and distilleries is well-documented. During the COVID-19 pandemic, Dahms (the Chair of the Commerce Committee) was implicated by a number of his colleagues as one of the main roadblocks to a bill that would have allowed Minnesota craft breweries to sell package sizes other than 750ml and 64oz to their patrons.

References

External links

Senator Gary Dahms official Minnesota Senate website
Project Vote Smart - Senator Gary Dahms Profile
Senator Gary Dahms official campaign website

1947 births
Living people
University of Minnesota College of Food, Agricultural and Natural Resource Sciences alumni
Republican Party Minnesota state senators
People from Redwood Falls, Minnesota
21st-century American politicians